John August Kusche (1869 – 1934) was a renowned botanist and entomologist who discovered many new species of moths and butterflies. The plant of the aster family, Erigeron kuschei, was named in his honor.

Biography 

Kusche's father was Johann Karl Wilhelm Kusche. August Kusche had three siblings from his father, named Herman, Ernst and Pauline, and four half siblings from a second marriage, named Bertha, Wilhelm, Heinrich and Reinhold. There were two other children from this marriage, who died young. His family were farmers, who he lived with in Kreuzburg, Germany.

Kusche attended a gardening school in Kreuzburg but left at a young age after unintentionally setting a forest fire.

He wrote letters back to his family, urging them to come to America. His father eventually did sometime shortly after February, 1893. His father started a homestead in Brownsville, Texas. His father caught Yellow Fever, although he managed to survive, leaving him a sick old man in his mid-fifties. He wrote to August, who was then living in Prescott, Arizona, asking for money. August wrote back, saying "Dear father, if you are out of money, see to it that you go back to Germany as soon as possible. Without any money here, you are lost,"

When August arrived in America, he got a job as a gardener on a Pennsylvanian farm. He had an affair with a Swiss woman, which resulted in a child. August denied being the child's father, but married her anyway. He went west, on horseback, and had his horse stolen by Native Americans. He ended up in San Francisco. His family joined him there. By this time, he had three sons and a daughter.After his children grew up, he began traveling and collecting moths and butterflies.

Later life 
He traveled to the South Seas, where he collected moths and butterflies. There, he caught a terrible fever that very nearly killed him. He was picked up by a government ship in New Guinea, and was unconscious until he awoke in a hospital in San Francisco. After that, he had hearing loss and lost all of his teeth. His doctor told him not to take any more trips to Alaska, which helped his condition.

In 1924, he lived in San Diego. He had taken a trip to Alaska just before this date. He worked as a gardener in California for nine years (1915–1924), where he died of stomach cancer.

Notable discoveries 
In 1928, Kusche donated 164 species of Lepidoptera he collected on Kauai between 1919 and 1920 to the Bishop Museum. Of those species, 55 had not previously been recorded on Kauai and 6 were newly discovered, namely Agrotis stenospila, Euxoa charmocrita, Plusia violacea, Nesamiptis senicula, Nesamiptis proterortha, and Scotorythra crocorrhoa.

The Essig Museum of Entomology listed 26 species collected by Kusche from California, Arizona, Alaska, and the Solomon Islands.

References 

19th-century German botanists
1869 births
1934 deaths
20th-century American botanists
German emigrants to the United States